Kundhavai was a historic and a popular name of a number of royal women in southern India between the ninth and eleventh century. Some of the women who went by the name Kundavai are as follows:

Kundhavai, the daughter of Western Ganga king Prithvipati I  (853-880 AD), who was married to the Bana prince Vikramaditya I, the son and successor of Malladeva. She gave several gifts to the Siva temple in Tiruvallam.

Rajarajan Kundhavi Alvar, the daughter of Raja Raja Chola and younger sister of Rajendra Chola, the queen of the Eastern Chalukya king Vimaladitya and the mother of Rajaraja Narendra.

Kundhavai Pirāttiyār, the elder sister of the king Raja Raja Chola, and the queen of the chief Vallavaraiyan Vandiyadevan mentioned in the Tanjore inscriptions.

References

Chola dynasty